Zubtsovsky (masculine), Zubtsovskaya (feminine), or Zubtsovskoye (neuter) may refer to:

Zubtsovsky District, a district of Tver Oblast, Russia
Zubtsovskaya, a rural locality (a village) in Arkhangelsk Oblast, Russia

See also
Zubtsov